The Mayor of Lucknow is the head of Lucknow Municipal Corporation. The mayor is the first citizen of the city. The mayor plays a decorative role of representing and upholding the dignity of the city and a functional role in deliberating over the discussions in the corporation. The role of the mayor is largely ceremonial.

The city is divided into 110 wards, each of them headed by a corporators who work under the mayor. In addition to the 110 councilors, there are Deputy Commissioners and Heads of various departments and Zonal officers.

Sanyukta Bhatia was the mayor of Lucknow, who was elected in 2017 Lucknow Municipal Corporation election and became the first Women mayor of the city. Currently the corporation has no mayor and there is a administrator period in the city.

Election of the Mayor 
The mayor is elected from within the ranks of the council in a quinquennial election. The elections are conducted in all 110 wards in the city to elect corporators. The party that wins the maximum number of seats holds an internal voting to decide the mayor.

The tenure of the mayor is of 5 years or till dissolution of municipal corporation, either by themselves or by state law.

List of Mayors of LMC 

Source:

See also 

2022 Lucknow Municipal Corporation election
 Lucknow Municipal Corporation
 2017 Lucknow Municipal Corporation election
 Mayors of Indian cities
 Lucknow

References 

Lists of mayors of places in India
Lucknow
Lists of mayors of places in Uttar Pradesh
Government of Lucknow